Nemo was an American indie rock band formed in Brooklyn, New York in 2002 by Luke McCartney and Dennis Tyhacz.  The band took their name from the character Captain Nemo in the novel 20,000 Leagues Under The Sea.

Their debut album Signs of Life was released in June 2004 on Binge Records.  The album was notable for its blend of new wave, ethereal acoustic sounds, and inspired indie rock.  It was recorded entirely in an apartment in Williamsburg, Brooklyn in 2003 prior to becoming one of the final LPs to be mastered at the Vic Thrill Salon in Brooklyn (shortly before the Salon was closed in 2004). The title track "Signs of Life" was featured in Season 2 of the PBS show Roadtrip Nation in 2005, and several of the songs on Signs of Life were also used as the backing music for NPR's Morning Edition show for several years after the album's initial release. McCartney and Tyhacz later recorded in a group in 2006 called The Sound Mirrors, and they released one LP The Calling in 2007, also on Binge Records.

Members
Luke McCartney, Dennis Tyhacz

Additional members (touring and/or recording):
Chris Plyem, Sam McCall

Albums 
Signs of Life Binge Records, 2004

Track listing 

	Metropolitan - 3:11	
	Northern Light	- 2:39	
	The Burn	- 1:59	
	Aviator - 2:23	
	Signs of Life - 3:05	
	Lunar Ship to Mars -2:33	
	Fiction of Reality - 2:34	
	Hampshire Brush - 2:39	
	Odyssey - 3:13	
	The Chariot - 2:20 
	Swimming in the Rhine - 2:33	
	Fall Away	- 2:23	
	Killer Bees - 1:17	
	Eternity of This	 - 2:40
	The Sun of Ulee - 2:58
	Ether - 1:53	
	Harbor - 2:34

References

External links
 Nemo Myspace Page
 Left Off The Dial.com Review of "Signs of Life" by Nemo
 Review of "Signs of Life" by Nemo by Independent Clauses.com
 Review of "Signs of Life" by Nemo by Indieworkshop.com
 Review of "Signs of Life" by Nemo by NYROCK.com
 Nemo 2005 Interview by Indieworkshop.com
 Review of "Signs of Life" by Nemo by Splendid E-Zine.com
 "Signs of Life" review by Delusions of Adequacy

Musical groups established in 2002
Musical groups from Brooklyn